Seymour is a town in Amatole District Municipality in the Eastern Cape province of South Africa.

The town is on the Katrivier Dam, 160 km north-west of East London and 35 km north-north-west of Alice. It was founded in 1853 and named after Colonel Charles Seymour who served as Military Secretary to the Governor, Sir George Cathcart. The town is in the newly established Raymond Mhlaba Local Municipality.

References

Populated places in the Raymond Mhlaba Local Municipality
Populated places established in 1853